Vilangalpattu is a village in the Cuddalore district of the Indian state of Tamil Nadu.

Villages in Cuddalore district

capital of vilangalpattu panchayat